Prorhinotermes flavus, is a species of subterranean termite of the genus Prorhinotermes. It is native to India, Sri Lanka, Andaman Islands and Nicobar Islands. It is found in coastal areas such as mangroves. It shows both dampwood and subterranean features, where they nests in dead trees but forage on soil as a typical subterranean termite. They are not known as pests.

References

External links
Semiochemicals of Prorhinotermes flavus

Termites
Insects described in 1910
Insects of Sri Lanka